Ahmed Abdou (born 1936) is a Comorian politician. He was prime minister of Comoros from 27 December 1996 to 9 September 1997.

Biography
He was born in Mutsamudu on the island of Anjouan. He served as finance minister in the autonomous government of the Comoros briefly during 1972, and again from 1973 until the country received independence in 1975. He became prominent again over 20 years later when in December 1996, he was appointed prime minister of the Comoros. In May 1997 there was a movement to dismiss him, but he survived a parliamentary confidence vote 38–2. The government ran into serious trouble in August 1997 when two of the Comoros's islands, including Abdou's home island of Anjouan, seceded from the union, and Abdou was dismissed in September 1997 after 9 months in office.

References

1936 births
Living people
People from Anjouan
Prime Ministers of the Comoros
Finance ministers of the Comoros
Government ministers of the Comoros